Kang Soo-jin (born October 19, 1965) is a South Korean voice actor who joined Korean Broadcasting System's voice acting division in 1998. He is best known for the roles of Artanis (StarCraft II: Legacy of the Void), Professor Moriarty (Sherlock), Inuyasha (Inuyasha), Dororo (Sgt. Frog), (Dibo The Gift Dragon), Shinichi Kudo (Detective Conan) and Monkey D. Luffy (One Piece). He also starred as Saeran Choi in the popular otome game Mystic Messenger. He also voiced the announcer for the 2020 Global StarCraft II League Season 3.

References

External links
 KBS Voice Acting Division

1965 births
Living people
South Korean male video game actors
South Korean male voice actors
20th-century South Korean male actors
21st-century South Korean male actors
South Korean Buddhists